Brandon Thomas may refer to:

Brandon Thomas (playwright) (1848–1914), English actor and playwright who wrote the hit farce, Charley's Aunt
Brandon Thomas (musician) (born 1980), American rock band singer
Brandon Thomas (American football), American football player
Brandon Thomas (footballer) (born 1995), Spanish footballer
Brandon Thomas-Asante (born 1998), English footballer

See also
Thomas Brandon (disambiguation)